Alton Johnson Adams Jr. (born October 20, 1979) is an American football coach and former player who is currently the co-offensive coordinator for the Oregon Ducks. He previously served as wide receivers coach for the Washington Huskies.

Early life and education
Junior Adams was born on October 20, 1979, in Fremont, California. After finishing high school as an All-American, Adams first played college football at Oregon State University, but he later transferred and finished his career at Montana State University.  Adams graduated with a bachelor's degree in sociology.

Coaching career
After graduating from Montana State, Adams became the wide receivers coach for the university from 2004 to 2006. After two years as a coach for Prosser High School, where he won a state championship in his sole year there, and Chattanooga, Adams became the wide receivers coach for Eastern Washington. Following a dominant four-year stint, highlighted by star Cooper Kupp, Adams left Eastern Washington to become a coach at Boise State. After being elevated to passing game coordinator at Boise State, Adams became the offensive coordinator for Western Kentucky. Adams left Western Kentucky in 2019 to a lower position, wide receivers coach, at Washington. Adams would later become offensive coordinator, however, becoming the co-offensive coordinator for Oregon in 2022.

References

1979 births

Living people
Oregon Ducks football coaches
People from Fremont, California
Montana State University alumni